Hybrid have remixed over 100 songs for over 40 artists. This list contains each remix by name along with the original recording artist's name. Note that Hybrid songs remixed by other artists are also included. Songs marked with * are bootlegs and fan remixes.

0-9
 2 Bad Mice - "Bombscare (Hybrid Mix)"

A
 Adeva - "Don't Think About It (Hybrid Mix)"
 Adeva - "Do Whatcha Do (Hybrid Remix)"
 Alanis Morissette - "So Pure (Hybrid Unreleased Remix)"
 Alanis Morissette - "Your House (Hybrid Forgive Me Mix)"
 Albion - "Air (Hybrid's Supersonic Remix)"
 Alison Limerick - "Put Your Faith in Me (Hybrid Matrix Dub)"
 Alison Limerick - "Put Your Faith in Me (Hybrid Higher Ground Mix)"
 Andreas Johnson - "Glorious (Hybrid Remix)"
 Andreas Johnson - "Glorious (Hybrid Instrumental)"
 Ayumi Hamasaki - "Prologue (Hybrid Remix)"
 Ayumi Hamasaki - "Teddy Bear (Hybrid Club Instrumental)"
 Ayumi Hamasaki - "Teddy Bear (Hybrid Club)"

B
 Blue Pearl - "Naked in the Rain '98 (Hybrid Remix)"
 BT - "Godspeed (Hybrid Dub Mix)"
 BT - "Godspeed (Hybrid Mix)"
 BT - "Never Gonna Come Back Down (Hybrid's Breaktek Mix)"
 BT - "Never Gonna Come Back Down (Hybrid's Echoplex Dub)"
 BT feat. Hybrid & Kirsty Hawkshaw - "Running Down the Way Up"
 BT feat. Hybrid & Kirsty Hawkshaw - "Running Down the Way Up (Hybrid's Space Manoeuvres Mix)"
 BT vs. Coldplay - "Broken Clocks (Hybrid's Breaktek Bootleg)"

C
 Carl Cox - "Phuture 2000 (Hybrid Remix)"
 Charlotte James - "Little Bit of This (Hybrid Remix)"
 Christian Fischer vs. Hybrid - "I Know"
 Chris Coco feat. Peter Green - "Albatross (Hybrid Remix)"
 Comix - "I Need Ya... Humm (Hybrid 12" Remix)"
 Comix - "I Need Ya... Humm (Hybrid 12" Dub)"
 Conjure One feat. Sinéad O'Connor - "Tears from the Moon (Hybrid's Twisted on The Terrace Mix = Pacha mix)"
 Conjure One feat. Sinéad O'Connor - "Tears from the Moon (Hybrid's Twisted on The Terrace Dub)"
 Cui Jian - "I Have Nothing (Hybrid Remix)"
 Cui Jian - "I Have Nothing (Hybrid Unreleased Instrumental)"

D
 Datura - "Mystic Motion (Hybrid Full Journey)"
 Datura - "Mystic Motion (Hybrid Chargin Mix)"
 Deluxtra - "Lift Me Up (Hybrid Remix)"
 DJ Jazzy Jeff & The Fresh Prince - "Summertime (Hybrid Remix)"
 DJ Rap - "Bad Girl (Hybrid Remix)"
 DJ's Rule - "Get into the Music (Hybrid Extended Remix)"
 DJ's Rule - "Get into The Music (Hybrid Edit)"
 Doves - "Break Me Gently (Hybrid Mix)"

E
 Eelke Kleijn - "Lone Ranger (Hybrid Soundsystem Remix)"
 Elite Force - "You (Hybrid Remix)"
 Energy 52 - "Café del Mar (Hybrid's Time Traveller Remix)"
 Every Little Thing - "Deatta Koro No You Ni (Hybrid Remix)"
 Every Little Thing - "Time Goes By (Hybrid Remix)"

F
 Filter - "Take a Picture (Hybrid Remix)"
 Freq Nasty feat. Phoebe One - "Boomin' Back Atcha (Hybrid's 'Music To Plough Fields To' Mix)"
 Friction & Spice - "Alright (Hybrid's Analogue Mix)"
 Friction & Spice - "Alright (Hybrid Breakbeat Mix)"
 Friction & Spice meet the (Three Wish Monkeys -AKA Hybrid)"- Work For love
 Future Funk Squad - "Towards the Sun (Hybrid Remix)"
 Foot Club - "Loveboy (Hybrid Fuzzy Peach Mix)"
 Foot Club - "Loveboy (Hybrid Luurv Dub)"
 Friday Night Posse vs Hybrid & Kriminal - "Everybody Get Up" (White Label Mashup)

G
 Golden Girls - "Kinetic (Hybrid's Audiopyrotechnic Mix)"
 Golden Girls - "Kinetic (Hybrid's Cross Modulation Dub)"
 Goldmine - "Natural (Hybrid's Jump Up Mix)"
 Gouryella - "Walhalla (Hybrid's Matrix Dub)"
 Gouryella - "Walhalla (Hybrid's Echoplex Mix)"
 Grayarea - "Gravity (Hybrid's Mix)"
 Grayarea feat. Erik Shepard - "Gravity (Hybrid's Love From Llanfair Remix)"
 Guy J - "Fly (Hybrid Soundsystem Remix)"

H
 Hard Rock Sofa & Swanky Tunes - "Here We Go / Quasar (Hybrid Remix)"
 Harry Gregson-Williams - "Evacuating London (Hybrid's Beatless Dub)" 
 Harry Gregson-Williams - "Evacuating London (Hybrid's Hiding In The Wardrobe Mix)"
 Harry Gregson-Williams - "Humvee Chase (Hybrid Remix)"
 Harry Gregson-Williams - "Man on Fire (Hybrid Remix)"
 Harry Gregson-Williams - "Man on Fire (Hybrid Remix Edit)"
 Harry Gregson-Williams - "Flying to the Castle (Hybrid Remix)"
 Harry Gregson-Williams - "Flying to the Castle "(Hybrid Credit edit)"
 Healy & Amos - "Bleachin' (Hybrid Switch Mix White)"
 Hybrid - "Accelerator (Joyrider Edit)"
 Hybrid - "Altitude (Original Promo Version)"
 Hybrid - "Burnin' (Hybrid's Burning Breakbeat Mix)"
 Hybrid - "Burnin' (Joyrider Edit)"
 Hybrid - "Cascade"
 Hybrid - "Celebrity Science (Kevens Mix)"*
 Hybrid - "Celebrity Science (PjD Mix)"*
 Hybrid - "Cipher´(We are in Control 2003 Demo)"
 Hybrid - "Concrete Boots
 Hybrid - "Demons
 Hybrid - "Dream Stalker (The Invisionary's Dark Evangelist Bootleg)"*
 Hybrid - "Dreaming Your Dreams (OneLive Version)"
 Hybrid - "Finished Symphony (Hybrid's 2003 Soundtrack Mix)"
 Hybrid - "Finished Symphony (Boom Jinx Remix)"
 Hybrid - "Finished Symphony (Deadmau5 Mix)"
 Hybrid - "Finished Symphony (Deadset Mix)"
 Hybrid - "Finished Symphony (Deadset Dubtool Mix)"
 Hybrid - "Finished Symphony (Hybrid's Echoplex Mix)"
 Hybrid - "Finished Symphony (Hybrid's Echoplex Mix Radio Edit)"
 Hybrid - "Finished Symphony (Hybrid M4 Corridor Mix)"
 Hybrid - "Finished Symphony (Hybrid's Soundtrack Edit)"
 Hybrid - "Finished Symphony (Hybrid's Soundtrack Mix)"
 Hybrid - "Finished Symphony (Sure Is Pure Remix)"
 Hybrid - "Gospel (Theme From Wide Angle Demo)"
 Hybrid - "Gravastar (Early Version)"
 Hybrid - "Groovology (Instrumental)"
 Hybrid - "Groovology (feat Chrissy Chris - "Vocal Mix)"
 Hybrid - "High Life (2000 Rework)"
 Hybrid - "High Life (Original Mix)"
 Hybrid - "High Life (Max Graham Remix)"
 Hybrid - "High Life (Mike Marshall's Low Life Mix)"
 Hybrid - "I'm Still Awake (Acoustic Demo)"
 Hybrid - "I'm Still Awake (Christian J Mix)"
 Hybrid - "I'm Still Awkake (Demo)"
 Hybrid - "I'm Still Awake (Grayarea Mix)"
 Hybrid - "I'm Still Awake (Grayarea's Il Postino Y Lo Stronzo Disoccupato Mix)"
 Hybrid - "I'm Still Awake (Planet Funk Vocal Mix)"
 Hybrid - "I'm Still Awake (Planet Funk Vocal Mix - "Radio Edit)"
 Hybrid - "I'm Still Awake (SUD Mix)"
 Hybrid - "I Choose Noise (Elite Force Remix)"
 Hybrid - "I Know (Acapella)"
 Hybrid - "I Know (Airless Mix)"*
 Hybrid - "I Know (Atmo Brtschitsch's Everyday Bootleg)"*
 Hybrid - "I Know (Ben Lewis Remix)"*
 Hybrid - "I Know (Capital J's Mash Up)"*
 Hybrid - "I Know (Chiller Twist Disturbed Remix)"*
 Hybrid - "I Know (Future Perfect Remix)"
 Hybrid - "I Know (JBreaks NuSkool Bootleg)"*
 Hybrid - "I Know (Keenan and Anderson Mix)"
 Hybrid - "I Know (Neogen Remix)"*
 Hybrid - "I Know (PB & J Remix)"*
 Hybrid - "I Know (Schldan Shizneagh Remix)"*
 Hybrid - "I Know (She Compilation Mix)"
 Hybrid - "I Know (Strings)"
 Hybrid - "I Know (Switchgear's Cityscape Mix)"*
 Hybrid - "I Know (Tears of Technology - I Know tha Breaks Mix)"*
 Hybrid - "I Know (Totem Pole Mix)"
 Hybrid - "I Know (V2 Remix)"*
 Hybrid - "If I Survive (2006 Version)"
 Hybrid - "If I Survive (Beber's Boleyn West Stand Mix)"
 Hybrid - "If I Survive (Commie Dark Dub)"
 Hybrid - "If I Survive (Hybrid's Echoplex Mix)"
 Hybrid - "If I Survive (Hybrid's Tyrant Dub)"
 Hybrid - "If I Survive (Instrumental)"
 Hybrid - "If I Survive (Instrumental Re-Edit)"
 Hybrid - "If I Survive (Interfearance Mix)"
 Hybrid - "If I Survive (Interfearence Dub)"
 Hybrid - "If I Survive (Jerome Sydenham Vocal Dub)"
 Hybrid - "If I Survive (Jerome Sydenham Vocal Dubstrumental)"
 Hybrid - "If I Survive (Soundtrack Edit)"
 Hybrid - "If I Survive (Views From Wide Angle Mix, Early Demo)"
 Hybrid - "If I Survive (Way Out West Vocal Remix)"
 Hybrid - "If I Survive (Way Out West Dub)"
 Hybrid - "In Good We Trust (O'Connor Remix)"*
 Hybrid - "In Your Face (Morning Sci-Fi Demo Vocal)"
 Hybrid - "Joyrider (Lotus Challenge Mix)"
 Hybrid - "Joyrider (Online Mix)"
 Hybrid - "Keep It In The Family (Soundtrack Version)"
 Hybrid - "Keep It In The Family (Tomas Barford Mix)"
 Hybrid - "Kill City (1999 Live Rework)"
 Hybrid - "Kill city (Demo)"
 Hybrid - "Kill City (DicryLium Remix)"*
 Hybrid - "Kill City (Edit)"
 Hybrid - "Kill City (Hybrid's VIP Mix)"
 Hybrid - "Kill City (Live Mix)"
 Hybrid - "Kinky (Heart's Desire Demo)"
 Hybrid - "Know Your Enemy (12" Extended Mix)"
 Hybrid - "Know Your Enemy (The Invisionary's Edit)"*
 Hybrid - "Last Man Standing (Ambient Reprise)"*
 Hybrid - "Last Man Standing (Group Therapy Mix)"
 Hybrid - "Lights Go Down (Edit A)"
 Hybrid - "Lights Go Down (Edit B)"
 Hybrid - "Marrakech (Demo)"
 Hybrid - "Marrakech (Omen Soundtrack Edit)"
 Hybrid - "Marrakech (The Emissary's Breaktek Remix/Mashup)"*
 Hybrid - "Menace (Full Mix)"
 Hybrid - "Mr. Smith (Original Mix)"
 Hybrid - "Mr. Smith (Scores Mix)"
 Hybrid - "Orbit (Soundtrack Version)"
 Hybrid - "Sinequanon (Impossible Eye Mix)"*
 Hybrid - "Sinequanon (Instrumental 'Slow Funk')"*
 Hybrid - "Sinequanon (Tunnel Remix)"
 Hybrid - "Sleepwalking (Future Funk Squad's 'Worst Nightmare' Dub)"
 Hybrid - "Sleepwalking (Future Funk Squad's 'Worst Nightmare' Remix)"
 Hybrid - "Sleepwalking (Hybrid's Original Mix)"
 Hybrid - "Sleepwalking (Hybrid's Something Else Mix)"
 Hybrid - "Snyper (High Velocity Mix)"
 Hybrid - "Snyper (Joyrider Edit)"
 Hybrid - "Swimming
 Hybrid - "Symphony (2006 Mix)"
 Hybrid - "Symphony Symphony (Hybrid's Symphonik Remix)"
 Hybrid - "Symphony (M4 Corridor Dub)"
 Hybrid - "Symphony (Original '96 Version = Sure is Pure Mix)"
 Hybrid - "Symphony (Original Breakbeat Mix)"
 Hybrid - "Symphony (Original Mix)"
 Hybrid - "Symphonic Euphoria
 Hybrid - "Symphony (Sure Is Pure Moto Disco Dub Mix)"
 Hybrid - "The Drop (Man on Fire Edit)"
 Hybrid - "Theme From Wide Angle (Hybrid's VIP Edit)"
 Hybrid - "Theme From Wide Angle (Joyrider Edit)"
 Hybrid - "Theme From Wide Angle (Rolling Thunder Dub)"
 Hybrid - "Theme From Wide Angle (Rolling Thunder Mix)"
 Hybrid - "Unfinished Symphony (Unreleased Orchestral Mix)"
 Hybrid - "Visible Noise (Demo)"
 Hybrid - "Visible Noise vs. Theme from Wide Angle"
 Hybrid - "Zulu (Orchestral Bootleg)"*
 Hybrid - "Zulu (Original Score)"
 Hybrid feat. Adam Taylor - "If I Survive (2003 Remix)"
 Hybrid feat. Andreas Carlson - "Fall Out of Love (Dekkards Roadkill Edit)"
 Hybrid feat. Andreas Carlson - "Fall Out of Love (Hybrid's Full Journey Mix)"
 Hybrid feat. Andreas Carlson - "Fall Out of Love (Hybrid's Gradual Dub)"
 Hybrid feat. Andreas Carlson - "Fall Out of Love (Hybrid's Burning Breakbeat Mix)"
 Hybrid feat. Andreas Carlson - "Fall Out of Love (Hybrid's Charging Piano Mix)"
 Hybrid feat. Andreas Carlson - "Fall Out of Love (Hybrid's Club Mix)"
 Hybrid feat. Andreas Carlson - "Fall Out of Love (Hybrid's Gate of Sean Mix)"
 Hybrid feat. Charlotte James - "The Formula of Fear"
 Hybrid feat. Charlotte James - "The Formula of Fear (Glen Morrison Remix)"
 Hybrid feat. Charlotte James - "The Formula of Fear (Hybrid's Echoplex Mix)"
 Hybrid feat. Charlotte James - "The Formula of Fear (Long Range Remix)"
 Hybrid feat. Chrissie Hynde - "Kid 2000 (7" Edit)"
 Hybrid feat. Chrissie Hynde - "Kid 2000 (Hybrid's Echoplex Mix)"
 Hybrid feat. Chrissie Hynde - "Kid 2000 (Original 12" Mix)"
 Hybrid feat. Chrissie Hynde - "Kid 2000 (Kayestone Instrumental)"
 Hybrid feat. Chrissie Hynde - "Kid 2000 (Kayestone Recon Remix)"
 Hybrid feat. John Graham - "Until Tomorrow (Demo)"
 Hybrid feat. John Graham - "Until Tomorrow (Serge Santiago Mix)"
 Hybrid feat. John Graham - "Until Tomorrow (Stefan Anion & Starfire's 'Surviving Another Day Mix)"
 Hybrid feat. Judie Tzuke - "Falling Down (Kosheen DJs Mix)"
 Hybrid feat. Kirsty Hawkshaw - "All I Want (Instrumental)"
 Hybrid feat. Kirsty Hawkshaw - "All I Want (Orchestral Mix)"
 Hybrid feat. Kirsty Hawkshaw - "All I Want (Stefan Anion All I Want)" (Stefan Anion's "All I Need" Re-Mash-Edit)"
 Hybrid feat. Kirsty Hawkshaw - "Blackout (Hybrid Y4K Mix)"
 Hybrid feat. Kirsty Hawkshaw - "Blackout (Inner & Outer Remix)"
 Hybrid feat. Kirsty Hawkshaw - "Blackout (The Cinematic Orchestra Mix)"
 Hybrid feat. Kirsty Hawkshaw - "Blackout (Tresh's Sci-Fi Breaks Mix)"*
 Hybrid feat. Kirsty Hawkshaw - "Just For Today (Jerome Sydenham Dub Mix)"
 Hybrid feat. Kirsty Hawkshaw - "Just For Today (Jerome Sydenham Mix)"
 Hybrid feat. Kirsty Hawkshaw - "Just For Today (The Invisionary's Bootleg Edit)"*
 Hybrid feat. Peter Hook - "As High as a Skyscraper (Demo for Higher than a Skyscraper)"
 Hybrid feat. Peter Hook - "Higher Than a Skyscraper (Boy 8-Bit Mix)"
 Hybrid feat. Peter Hook - "Higher Than a Skyscraper]] (Freq Nasty's Ragga Rock Relic)"
 Hybrid feat. Peter Hook - "Higher Than a Skyscraper (Hybrid Twitch And Sweat Mix)"
 Hybrid feat. Peter Hook - "Higher Than a Skyscraper (Orb's Towers Of Babel Mix)"
 Hybrid feat. Peter Hook - " Higher Than a Skyscraper (Satoshi Tomiie 3D Dub)"
 Hybrid feat. Peter Hook - "Higher Than a Skyscraper (Satoshi Tomiie Remix)"
 Hybrid feat. Peter Hook - "Higher Than a Skyscraper (Strings Only)"
 Hybrid feat. Peter Hook - "Higher Than a Skyscraper (The Orb Remix)"
 Hybrid feat. Peter Hook - "True to Form (Acoustic Demo)"
 Hybrid feat. Peter Hook - "True to Form (Acoustic Version)"
 Hybrid feat. Peter Hook - "True to Form (Demo)"
 Hybrid feat. Peter Hook - "True to Form (Gazzmann's New Form Remix)"*
 Hybrid feat. Peter Hook - "True to Form (John Creamer & Stephane K Mix)"
 Hybrid feat. Peter Hook - "True to Form (John Creamer & Stephane K Remix)" [Edit]
 Hybrid feat. Peter Hook - "True to Form (Soundtrack Mix)"
 Hybrid feat. Perry Farrell - "Dogstar (Satellite Party Demo)"
 Hybrid feat. Perry Farrell - "Dogstar (Trent Cantrelle Remix)"
 Hybrid feat. Sally Larkin - "Experiment IV"
 Hybrid vs. Michael Jackson - "Bad Symphony (Finished Symphony / Bad Mash-Up)"
 Hyper Go-Go & Adeva - "Do Watcha Do (Early Hybrid Remix)"
 Hyper Go Go & Adeva - "Do Watcha Do (Hybrid Remix)"
 Hyper Go-Go - "High (Hybrid Dub)"
 Hyper Go-Go - "High (Hybrid Remix)"

I
 Idris Elba - "Even If I Die (Hybrid Remix)"
 Inner Sanctum - "How Soon is Now (Hybrid Remix)"

J
 Jazzed Up - "Alright (Hybrid Analogue Adventure Remix)"
 Jean-Michel Jarre - "C'est La Vie (Hybrid's Echoplex Mix)"
 Jean Michel Jarre - "C'est La Vie (Hybrid's Matrix Dub)"
 Jeff Wayne - "The Eve of the War (Hybrid's Fire in the Sky Remix)"
 Jeff Wayne - "The Eve of the War - Introduction (Hybrid Remix)"
 Jez & Choopie - "Yim (Hybrid's Sunrise Remix)"
 Jez & Choopie - "Yim (Hybrid Radio Edit)"
 John Creamer & Stephane K - "I Love You (Hybrid's Claustrophobic Remix)"
 John Creamer & Stephane K - "I Love You (Hybrid's Unreleased Claustrophobic Acappella)"
 John Creamer & Stephane K vs. Hybrid vs. Dylan Rhymes - "I Love You (Chamber Remix)"

K
 Kate Bush - "Experiment IV (Hybrid Remix)"
 Kevin Aviance - "Din Da Da (Hybrid Remix)"
 Killahurtz - "Kiss For The Dying (Hybrid's Echoplex 0405 Mix)"
 Killahurtz - "Kiss For The Dying (Hybrid Matrix Dub)"
 Kinnie Starr - "Alright (Hybrid Dub Mix)"
 Kinnie Starr - "Alright (Hybrid's Toronto Tech Dub)"
 Kinnie Starr - "Alright (Hybrid Vocal Mix)"
 Kriminal - "Loud N' Proud (Hybrid Dub)"
 Kriminal - "Loud N' Proud (Hybrid Mix)"

L
 Lennie De Ice - "We Are I.E. (Hybrid's Dark Dub)"
 Lennie De Ice - "We Are I.E. (Hybrid's Dark Mix)"
 Lennie De Ice - "We Are I.E. (Hybrid's Lite Mix)"
 Lennie De Ice - "We Are I.E. (Hybrid's Pumping Mix)"
 Long Range - "Just One More (Hybrid's Matrix Dub)"
 Long Range - "Just One More (Hybrid Remix)"
 Losers - "Summertime Rolls (Hybrid Soundsystem Mix)"
 Love Deluxe - "Surrender (Hybrid Mix)"

M
 Madonna - "Music (Hybrid Mashup Dub)"
 Maurice - "Feline (Hybrid Original Union Remix)"
 Megatonk - "Belgium (Hybrid Remix)"
 Moby - "Bodyrock (Hybrid's Bodyshock Remix)"
 Moby - "South Side (Hybrid's Dishing Pump Instrumental)"
 Moby feat. Gwen Stefani - "South Side (Hybrid's Dishing Pump Remix)"
 Monk & Canatella - "Enter The Monk (Hybrid Electrotek Club Mix)"
 Monk & Canatella - "Enter The Monk (Hybrid Electrotek Dub Mix)"
 Montano vs. The Trumpet Man - "Itza Trumpet Thing (Hybrid Remix)"
 Musique vs. U2 - "New Years Dub (Hybrid Remix)"

N
 New Order - "People on the High Line (Hybrid Remix)"
 New Order - "People on the High Line (Hybrid Armchair Remix)"
 Nights at the Round Tables - "Lellenda "El Espiritu" (Hybrid Remix)"
 Nine Inch Nails -	"Echoplex (Hybrid Bootleg)"

P
 Philip Bailey - "Steppin Through Time (Hybrid Mix)"
 Philip Bailey - "Steppin Through Time (Hybrid Mix)" [Instrumental]
 Planet Funk - "Everyday (Hybrid's 1150 Remix)"
 Prince vs. Hybrid - "Altitude vs. I Would Die 4 U (Prince Mash-Up)"*

R
 Radiohead - "Everything in Its Right Place (Hybrid Remix)"
 R.E.M. - "The Great Beyond (Hybrid Remix)"
 Rootjoose - "Mr. Fixit (Hybrid Mix)"
 Rob Dougan - "Clubbed to Death (Hybrid Remix)"
 Ron Houder - "Outskirts (Hybrid's Tech Funk Break Mix)"
 Ron Houder - "Outskirts (Hybrid's Tech Funk Remix)"

S
 Sabres of Paradise - "Smokebelch II (Hybrid Bootleg)"
 Sarah McLachlan - "Fear (Hybrid's Loathing Dub)"
 Sarah McLachlan - "Fear (Hybrid's Super Collider Mix)"
 Saint Etienne - "Boy Is Crying (Hybrid's Breaktek Remix)"
 Saint Etienne - "Boy Is Crying (Hybrid's Breaktek Instrumental)"
 Salt Tank - "Dimension (Hybrid's Audio Candy Remix)"
 Sasha vs. Phantom Beats - "Xpander/Don't Care (Hybrid Bootleg)"*
 Satellite Party - "Wish Upon a Dogstar (Hybrid Vocal Mix)"
 Satellite Party - "Wish Upon a Dogstar (Hybrid Instrumental)"
 Satoshi Tomiie - "Love in Traffic (Hybrid Bootleg)"*
 Shifter & Carvell - "Dark Distance (Hybrid Remix)"
 Shiloh vs. Radiohead - "Nude Flywheel (Hybrid Bootleg)"
 Soulwax - "E Talking (Hybrid Remix)"*
 Stefan Anion & Starfire vs. Orbital (Inferior / Orbital) - "Chime (Hybrid Re-Edit)"

T
 Tejo, Black Alien & Speed - "Follow Me Follow Me (Quem Que Caguetou?) (Fast 5 Hybrid Remix)"
 The Future Sound of London - "My Kingdom (Hybrid Y4K Remix)" 
 The Future Sound of London - "Papua New Guinea (Hybrid Full Length Mix)"
 The Crystal Method - "Name of the Game (Hybrid's LA Blackout Remix)"
 The Crystal Method - "Name of the Game (Hybrid's Blackout in L.A. Mix)"
 The Foot Club - "Loveboy (Hybrid's Fuzzy Peach Mix)"
 The Foot Club - "Loveboy (Hybrid's Luurv Dub)"
 The Orb - "From a Distance (Hybrid's Meadow Ladies Remix)"
 Trifonic - "Parks on Fire (Hybrid Remix)"
 Truman & Wolff feat. Steel Horses - "Come Again (Hybrid's Original Remix)"
 Truman & Wolff feat. Steel Horses - "Come Again (PF Project's Dope Bomb Mix)"

U
 U2 - "New Years Day (Hybrid Remix)"
 Überzone - "4 Bit (Hybrid's Back to Analogue Mix)"
 Unkle - "Glow (Hybrid Remix)"
 Uno Clio - "Close to the Edge (Hybrid Remix)"

V
 Vector 13 vs. Opencloud - "Ferara vs. Time Stand Still (Hybrid's Mash-up)"
 Vernon's Wonderland - "Vernon's Wonderland (Hybrid Echoplex Mix)"
 Vernon's Wonderland - "Vernon's Wonderland (Hybrids Matrix Dub)"

Z
 Zero V.U. - "Feel So Good (Hybrid's Breakbeat Remix)"
 Zero V.U. - "Feel So Good (Hybrid Epic Vocal Mix)"

Lists of remixed songs by artist